Michael Rogers (born 20 December 1979) is an Australian retired professional road bicycle racer who competed professionally between 1999 and 2016, for the , , ,  and  teams. He is a three-time World Time Trial Champion, winning consecutively in 2003 (after David Millar was stripped for doping), 2004 and 2005, and won Grand Tour stages at the Tour de France and the Giro d'Italia.

In April 2016, Rogers announced via Twitter, that he was being forced to retire from professional cycling due to a congenital heart defect condition which had been worsening.

Career

Early career
Rogers was part of the Australian Institute of Sport, which led him to move to Europe at age 16 as an amateur. He started as a track racer under coach Charlie Walsh.

At the 2002 Tour Down Under, Rogers' team-prepared bicycle was damaged in a collision with a motorcycle (which was not captured on TV cameras) forcing Rogers to come to a halt by the roadside. There were no team cars nearby, and Rogers appeared visibly frustrated with the turn of events. Fortunately an amateur cyclist, Adam Pyke, who was spectating offered his own Colnago bicycle as a replacement and Rogers was able to continue needing only a minor saddle height adjustment on route from a mechanic alongside in a car. He went on to finish second on the stage, took the race lead, and ultimately went on to win the race overall. The entire episode including swapping bicycles was captured by the television cameras while Rogers, Pyke and the borrowed bicycle were reunited at the end of the stage by the Australian broadcaster Seven in a televised interview.

Rogers won the world time-trial championship in 2003, 2004 and 2005. He came second in 2003 but became champion after the winner, David Millar, was disqualified for doping. Rogers received his rainbow jersey and gold medal on the day of the 2004 championship, thereby receiving two gold medals on the same day.

In the 2003 Tour de France, Rogers helped Richard Virenque win his sixth mountains classification. He was the last rider left to help in Virenque's day-long escape and stage win.

Rogers finished fourth in the road time trial at the 2004 Olympics in Athens. In May 2011 US cyclist Tyler Hamilton returned his gold medal for this event after admitting to doping during his cycling career, and in August 2012 the International Olympic Committee formally stripped Hamilton of his victory, resulting in Rogers being awarded the bronze medal. In September 2015, he received the Olympic medal in a ceremony at the IOC headquarters in Lausanne, Switzerland.

T Mobile (2006–2010)
Rogers joined  for the 2006 season, and finished 9th overall in the Tour de France. In an interview during the 2006 season, Rogers disclosed that he had received training advice by Italian doctor Michele Ferrari for several months during 2006.

On 15 July, Rogers withdrew on the 8th stage of the 2007 Tour de France after breaking a collarbone in a crash descending the Cormet de Roselend. He continued until the doctor arrived from attending fellow Australian Stuart O'Grady, who ended up stretchered to hospital. It was after this that Rogers contracted infectious mononucleosis (glandular fever), which caused a dip in his racing form for some time.

In 2010, as leader of his team, he won the Vuelta a Andalucía, and then the Tour of California (the first non-American to do so). After a disappointing Tour de France (37th overall), Rogers announced he would concentrate in future on shorter races (e.g. one week in length) as he was no longer suited to the longer tours.

Team Sky (2011–2012)

In October 2010 it was announced that he would leave  and join British based  for the 2011 racing season. However he suffered a relapse of his mononucleosis early in the season and was unable to defend his 2010 Tour of California title. Rogers returned to fitness towards the end of the season.

Rogers began the 2012 season with third place in the Australian National Time Trial Championships, and led  at the Tour Down Under, where he finished 4th in the general classification. Rogers then rode the Critérium du Dauphiné, helping leader Bradley Wiggins win the race, whilst finishing second overall himself after a strong ride in the time trial. Rogers was selected in the  squad for the Tour de France, as one of Wiggins' key domestiques. He suffered a crash towards the end of Stage 1, but was able to make it back to the peloton. Rogers played a key team role in the rest of the race, setting the tempo on mountains and notably bringing back a long range attack by Cadel Evans on Stage 11, as Sky ultimately achieved a 1–2 finish in the GC with Wiggins and Chris Froome.

Team Saxo–Tinkoff (2013–2016)
Rogers left Sky to join  in 2012 following a new Sky policy requiring all riders to sign to confirm they have no history of doping although he denied leaving for that reason.

In May, Rogers was the runner-up to Tejay van Garderen in the Tour of California. In July Rogers rode the Tour de France in support of Alberto Contador and finished in 16th place. In October he won the Japan Cup one-day race. In December it was announced that he had tested positive for clenbuterol at the latter race, and was suspended from cycling pending further investigation. On 23 April 2014 the Union Cycliste Internationale (UCI) announced he would be cleared of any wrongdoing, no further action would be taken and that Rogers would be free to race again. The UCI accepted that there was a significant probability that the clenbuterol came from contaminated meat consumed while Rogers was competing in China, where the drug is often consumed by animals in slaughterhouses to exhibit better performance in farm sporting events.

He returned to racing just in time to ride the 2014 Giro d'Italia. Throughout much of the race, he rode in support of Rafał Majka. He won his first Grand Tour individual stage on the eleventh stage and also won the penultimate stage summit finish at the Monte Zoncolan. On 22 July 2014, Rogers won his first Tour de France stage, winning stage 16 of the race. The longest stage of the race, a  route from Carcassonne to Bagnères-de-Luchon, Rogers attacked Cyril Gautier at the bottom of the descent of the Port de Balès with  remaining to win in solo fashion.

Post-cycling career
After his active cycling career Rogers had been working as 's technical partner manager, and, prior to that, he had been the founder and CEO of virtual-world training platform VirtuGO, which closed down in November 2019. Since November 2020 Rogers is employed by the UCI as its "innovation manager".

Major results

1996
 1st  Time trial, National Junior Road Championships
1997
 UCI Junior Track Cycling World Championships
1st  Team pursuit
1st  Points race
 2nd  Time trial, UCI Junior Road World Championships
1998
 1st  Scratch race, Commonwealth Games
 1st  Individual pursuit, National Track Championships
1999
 2nd  Time trial, UCI Under-23 Road World Championships
2000
 1st Stage 2 Tour Down Under
 3rd  Time trial, UCI Under-23 Road World Championships
2001
 2nd Grand Prix Eddy Merckx (with Fabian Cancellara)
 2nd Duo Normand (with Fabian Cancellara)
 4th Overall Redlands Bicycle Classic
 4th Joseph Vögeli Memorial
 6th Chrono des Herbiers
 8th Firenze–Pistoia
 9th Overall Circuit Franco-Belge
 10th Circuito de Getxo
2002
 1st  Overall Tour Down Under
1st Stage 2
 1st  Overall Tour de Beauce
 2nd  Time trial, Commonwealth Games
 2nd Time trial, National Road Championships
 3rd Overall International Tour of Rhodes
 5th Sparkassen Giro Bochum
 5th Chrono des Herbiers
 6th Poreč Trophy
 8th Time trial, UCI Road World Championships
 9th Grand Prix des Nations
2003
 1st  Time trial, UCI Road World Championships
 1st  Overall Deutschland Tour
1st Stage 6 (ITT)
 1st  Overall Route du Sud
1st Stage 3 (ITT)
 1st  Overall Tour of Belgium
 2nd Time trial, National Road Championships
 2nd Grand Prix Eddy Merckx (with László Bodrogi)
 4th Overall Circuit de la Sarthe
1st  Young rider classification
 5th Overall Tour de Picardie
 6th Grand Prix des Nations
 9th LuK Challenge Chrono (with László Bodrogi)
2004
 1st  Time trial, UCI Road World Championships
 2nd Firenze–Pistoia
 3rd  Time trial, Olympic Games
 4th Grand Prix des Nations
 6th Overall Tour de Luxembourg
 7th Chrono des Herbiers
 8th Overall Paris–Nice
1st Young rider classification
 9th LuK Challenge Chrono (with Patrik Sinkewitz)
2005
 1st  Time trial, UCI Road World Championships
 2nd Overall Tour de Suisse
 2nd Chrono des Herbiers
 3rd Gran Premio di Chiasso
 4th Overall Volta a Catalunya
 7th Overall Tour of Britain
 8th Overall Tour of the Basque Country
 8th Tour du Haut Var
 8th LuK Challenge Chrono (with Patrik Sinkewitz)
 9th Overall Settimana Internazionale di Coppi e Bartali
2006
 2nd Overall Regio-Tour
1st Stage 3
 4th LuK Challenge Chrono (with Serhiy Honchar)
 5th Overall Tour of Britain
 8th Time trial, UCI Road World Championships
 8th Overall Circuit de la Sarthe
 9th Overall Tour de France
2007
 2nd Overall Volta a Catalunya
 4th Overall Settimana Internazionale di Coppi e Bartali
 4th Overall Regio-Tour
 7th Overall Tour of California
2008
 2nd Overall Tour of Missouri
 2nd Overall Sachsen Tour
 3rd Overall Eneco Tour
 Olympic Games
5th Road race
8th Time trial
2009
 National Road Championships
1st  Time trial
2nd Road race
 3rd Overall Tour of California
 6th Overall Tour Down Under
 6th Overall Giro d'Italia
1st Stage 1 (TTT)
 8th Overall Tour of the Basque Country
2010
 1st  Overall Tour of California
 1st  Overall Vuelta a Andalucía
 2nd Overall Critérium International
 3rd Overall Tour de Romandie
 3rd Montepaschi Strade Bianche
 5th Time trial, UCI Road World Championships
 6th Overall Tirreno–Adriatico
2012
 1st  Overall Bayern Rundfahrt
1st Stages 2 & 4 (ITT)
 2nd Overall Critérium du Dauphiné
 3rd Time trial, National Road Championships
 3rd Overall Critérium International
 4th Overall Tour Down Under
 5th Overall Tour de Romandie
 6th Time trial, Olympic Games
 9th Overall Danmark Rundt
2013
  1st Japan Cup
 2nd Overall Tour of California
 6th Overall Critérium du Dauphiné
2014
 Giro d'Italia
1st Stages 11 & 20
 1st Stage 16 Tour de France
 3rd Overall Route du Sud
2015
 7th Overall Eneco Tour

Grand Tour general classification results timeline

References

External links

 

1979 births
Living people
Australian male cyclists
Cyclists from New South Wales
Cyclists at the 2004 Summer Olympics
Cyclists at the 2008 Summer Olympics
Cyclists at the 2012 Summer Olympics
Olympic cyclists of Australia
Olympic medalists in cycling
Olympic bronze medalists for Australia
UCI Road World Champions (elite men)
Cyclists at the 1998 Commonwealth Games
Cyclists at the 2002 Commonwealth Games
People from the Australian Capital Territory
Commonwealth Games gold medallists for Australia
Australian Institute of Sport cyclists
Australian Giro d'Italia stage winners
2014 Tour de France stage winners
Australian Tour de France stage winners
Cyclists at the 2000 Summer Olympics
Commonwealth Games silver medallists for Australia
Commonwealth Games medallists in cycling
ACT Academy of Sport alumni
Australian track cyclists
People from Mendrisio
Medalists at the 2004 Summer Olympics
Medallists at the 1998 Commonwealth Games
Medallists at the 2002 Commonwealth Games